Charles Dilke may refer to:

 Charles Wentworth Dilke (1789–1864), editor of the Athenaeum from 1830
 Sir Charles Wentworth Dilke, 1st Baronet (1810–1869), son of the above, known as Sir Wentworth Dilke
 Sir Charles Dilke, 2nd Baronet (1843–1911),  a prominent Liberal politician in Britain